The Immediate Geographic Region of Pirapora is one of the 7 immediate geographic regions in the Intermediate Geographic Region of Montes Claros, one of the 70 immediate geographic regions in the Brazilian state of Minas Gerais and one of the 509 of Brazil, created by the National Institute of Geography and Statistics (IBGE) in 2017.

Municipalities 
It comprises 7 municipalities.

 Buritizeiro     
 Ibiaí    
 Lassance    
 Pirapora     
 Ponto Chique    
 Santa Fé de Minas  
 Várzea da Palma

References 

Geography of Minas Gerais